Zwe Thet Paing (also known as Zwe Paing, born 28 November 1998) is a footballer from Burma, and a midfielder for the Myanmar national U-23 football team and Yangon United F.C.

In 2019, Zwe Thet Paing was signed to Shan United senior team and named in the Myanmar national U-23 team to compete in the 2019 SEA Games. In 2022, he was signed to Yangon United F.C.

Honor
 2019 MNL Champions
 2020 MFF Charity Cup Champions

References

1998 births
Living people
Sportspeople from Yangon
Burmese footballers
Myanmar international footballers
Association football forwards
Yangon United F.C. players